Kerewalapitiya is a suburb of Wattala, which acts an interchange to connect the Airport Expressway and the OCE-Expressway. Kerawalpitiya has opened an icon for Sri Lanka's largest privately owned power station, the Yugadanavi Power Station, and the beach resorts are attested in provision to satisfy the creation to the Airport Expressway and the reclamation of the old Dutch Canal.

References
Kerawalapitiya Power Station
Airport Expressway

Populated places in Western Province, Sri Lanka